In signal processing, the half time is the time it takes for the amplitude of a pulse to drop from 100% to 50% of its peak value.

Signal processing